Collectible Spoons is a greatest hits collection by the Canadian new wave band Spoons.  It includes material from their first four albums on Ready Records (including a couple of tracks from their lesser-known debut album Stick Figure Neighbourhood), but ignores the next two (much more guitar-driven) albums, Bridges Over Borders and Vertigo Tango on Anthem Records. This CD is now out-of-print.

Track listing
 "Trade Winds" (Gordon Deppe) - 2:15
 "Nova Heart" (Deppe) - 4:24
 "Arias & Symphonies" (Deppe) - 4:47
 "Smiling in Winter" (Deppe, Sandy Horne) - 3:48
 "Romantic Traffic" (Deppe, Rob Preuss) - 3:33
 "Tell No Lies" (Deppe) - 2:54
 "Talk Back" (Deppe, Preuss) - 4:36
 "Old Emotions" (Deppe, Horne) - 3:41
 "The Rhythm" (Deppe, Horne) - 4:06
 "Red Light" (Deppe) - 4:39
 "Conventional Beliefs" (Deppe) - 3:52
 "One in Ten Words" (Deppe, Preuss) - 4:09
 "Blow Away" (Deppe) - 5:57
 "Nova Heart (Extended Mix)" (Deppe) - 6:41

Trivia 
The photo on the front of the album is taken in the CN Tower's Space Deck.

Personnel 
 Gordon Deppe - vocals, guitar
 Sandy Horne - vocals, bass
 Rob Preuss - keyboards
 Derrick Ross - drums

References

1994 greatest hits albums
Spoons (band) albums
Albums produced by Nile Rodgers